The Saginaw Valley State Cardinals football program is a college football team that represents Saginaw Valley State University in the Great Lakes Intercollegiate Athletic Conference, a part of NCAA Division II.  The team has had six head coaches since its first recorded football game in 1975. The current coach is Ryan Brady who took the position prior to the 2019 season.

Key

Coaches
Statistics correct as of the end of the 2022 college football season.

Notes

References

Lists of college football head coaches

Michigan sports-related lists